Stanislav Kulish (born 8 February 1989) is a Ukrainian professional footballer who plays as a midfielder for VPK-Ahro Shevchenkivka.

Career
Kulish is product of youth team system of FC Dnipro Dnipropetrovsk.

Kulish became the second highest scorer in one season when he scored 29 goals for Stal Dniprodzerzhynsk during the 2012–13 Ukrainian Second League season.

In March 2023 he signed for Skoruk Tomakivka.

Honours
SC Dnipro-1
 Ukrainian First League: 2018–19

Stal Kamianske
 Ukrainian First League: 2014-15
 Ukrainian Second League: 2013–14

Individual
Top Scorer of Ukrainian First League: 2018-19  (17 goals)
Top Scorer of Ukrainian First League: 2014-15  (21 goals)

References

External links
 
 

1989 births
Living people
Footballers from Dnipro
Ukrainian footballers
FC Elektrometalurh-NZF Nikopol players
FC Stal Kamianske players
FC Dnipro-75 Dnipropetrovsk players
FC Dnipro-2 Dnipropetrovsk players
FC Metalist Kharkiv players
FC Oleksandriya players
NK Veres Rivne players
SC Dnipro-1 players
FC Volyn Lutsk players
FC Kremin Kremenchuk players
FC VPK-Ahro Shevchenkivka players
FC Skoruk Tomakivka players
Association football midfielders
Ukrainian Premier League players